Tracheliodes is a genus of wasps belonging to the family Crabronidae.

The species of this genus are found in Europe, Africa and Northern America.

Species:
 Crabro succinalis (Cockerell, 1909) 
 Crabro tornquisti (Cockerell, 1909)

References

Crabronidae
Hymenoptera genera